The Georgia national badminton team represents Georgia in international badminton team competitions. The national team is controlled by the Georgian Badminton Federation, the governing body of Georgian badminton. Georgia competed in before 1991 as part of the Soviet Union national badminton team. The team competed independently after the dissolution of the Soviet Union.

The Georgian junior team also participated in the BWF World Junior Championships mixed team event, also known as the Suhandinata Cup.

Participation in BWF competitions
Suhandinata Cup

Participation in Balkan Badminton Championships 
The Balkan Badminton Championships is a series of tournaments organized by the Balkan Badminton Association and involves participants from countries in the Balkans. The junior team championships are divided into four different age groups, which are U19, U17, U15 and U13.

U19

Current squad 

Men
Nika Chkheidze
Daniel Tatevosyan
Garry Ter-Karapetyan

Women
Marina Ovasapyan
Lizi Zumbulidze

See also 

 Sport in Georgia

References

Badminton
National badminton teams
Badminton in Georgia (country)